Coumestan is a heterocyclic organic compound.  Coumestan forms the central core of a variety of natural compounds known collectively as coumestans.  Coumestans are oxidation products of pterocarpan that are similar to coumarin.  Coumestans, including coumestrol, a phytoestrogen, are found in a variety of plants. Food sources high in coumestans include split peas, pinto beans, lima beans, and especially alfalfa and clover sprouts.

Coumestrol has about the same binding affinity for the ER-β estrogen receptor as 17β-estradiol, but much less affinity than 17α-estradiol, although the estrogenic potency of coumestrol at both receptors is much less than that of 17β-estradiol.

Because of the estrogenic activity of some coumestans, a variety of syntheses have been developed that allow the preparation of coumestans so that their pharmacological effects can be explored.

Coumestans

References